International Islamic Unity Conference may refer to:
International Islamic Unity Conference (Iran)
International Islamic Unity Conference (US)